Self-Portrait is a 1623-1630 self-portrait by Peter Paul Rubens. Since 1972 it has hung in the Rubenshuis in Antwerp.

Sources
 Rinck, Patrick De, "Dit is België" in tachtig meesterwerken, Athenaeum-Pollak & Van Gennep, Amsterdam, 2010, 206. .

Rubens
Rubens
Rubens
Portraits by Peter Paul Rubens